Cedius is a genus of ant-loving beetles in the family Staphylinidae. There are at least three described species in Cedius.

Species
 Cedius cruralis Park, 1949
 Cedius spinosus LeConte, 1849
 Cedius ziegleri LeConte, 1849

References

Further reading

 
 
 
 
 
 
 
 

Pselaphitae